Mariam Ibekwe (née Nnodu; born 29 October 1969) is a Nigerian former track and field athlete who competed in the shot put.

Ibekwe won her first international medals in 1989, taking the title at the West African University Games and a silver medal behind Hanan Ahmed Khaled at the 1989 African Championships in Athletics, held on home turf in Lagos. She was again behind Egypt's Khaled at the 1991 All-Africa Games, coming third on that occasion.

She had a break from international competition in the mid-1990s, but returned in 1997 with a win at the West African Athletics Championships and eighth at the 1998 IAAF World Cup. She continued to compete into her thirties, being a finalist at the 2003 All-Africa Games and the 2003 Afro-Asian Games. Her career peak came at the age of forty, when she won the shot put gold medal at the 2010 African Championships in Athletics. In her final major international appearance, she was seventh at the 2010 IAAF Continental Cup.

At national level, she won three straight titles at the Nigerian Athletics Championships between 1989 and 1991, becoming the first woman to throw beyond fourteen metres at the competition. Chukwuemeka won the next seven titles and Ibekwe won her sixth national title in 2006.

International competitions

National titles
Nigerian Athletics Championships
Shot put: 1989, 1990, 1991, 1997, 1998, 2006

See also
List of champions of the African Championships in Athletics

References

External links

Living people
1969 births
Nigerian female shot putters
African Games bronze medalists for Nigeria
African Games medalists in athletics (track and field)
Athletes (track and field) at the 1991 All-Africa Games
Athletes (track and field) at the 2003 All-Africa Games
20th-century Nigerian women
21st-century Nigerian women